Vasser may refer to:
 negelvaser, a ritual washing
Notable people bearing the name include:
 Jimmy Vasser (born 1965), American racing driver
 Daniel "Dan" Vasser, a fictional character on the American TV drama Journeyman
 Katie Vasser, a fictional character on Journeyman

See also 
 Wasser (disambiguation)
 Vassar (disambiguation)
 Vassar College

Yiddish words and phrases